was mayor of Hiroshima from October 22, 1945 to March 22, 1947 and was elected as member of the Hiroshima Prefectural Assembly in 1911.

Following the atomic attack on Hiroshima on August 6, 1945, a period of political vacuum was created, as the city lay in ruins its mayor Senkichi Awaya was killed. Out of the 40 members of the city council, 8 were killed in the bombing and most living members were unable to attend sessions due to their injuries. In September 1945, the Hiroshima City Council held an emergency session where it decided to appoint Kihara as the new mayor, and following approval by the Ministry of Interior, he was inaugurated as mayor on October 22, 1945. As part of his policy of reconstruction, he established in January 1946 a separate department within Hiroshima municipality to make decisions on reconstruction without the need of city council approval and was officially titled Restoration Bureau, consisting of 30 members and headed by former mayor Wakami Fujita. He remained mayor of Hiroshima until he was dismissed by the US occupation authorities as part of the purge of Japanese officials who took part in supporting the Japanese military during the Second World War.

Following his dismissal from office, he supported the policies of Shinzo Hamai and kept working for him unofficially till his death.

Notes

References
 Shinzo Hamai, A-Bomb Mayor: Warnings and Hope from Hiroshima (Hiroshima, 2010)
 Robert Jungk, Children of the Ashes (1st English ed. 1961)

Mayors of Hiroshima
Members of the House of Representatives (Japan)
1884 births
1951 deaths
Politicians from Hiroshima Prefecture